The 2011 IPC Biathlon and Cross-Country Skiing World Championships took place 2–11 April 2011 in Khanty-Mansiysk, Russia. IPC stands for International Paralympic Committee. This was the first time these championships were hosted in Russia, and the first time the championships were hosted in the same city as the IBU Biathlon World Championships which was held in Khanty-Mansiysk from March 3 to March 13, 2011.

Skiers competed in sitting, standing or visually impaired classification categories in various biathlon and cross-country skiing events.

The Opening ceremony was held on March 31, and the Closing ceremony was scheduled to be held on April 10.

Canadian Brian McKeever competed at the Championships without his brother Robin McKeever as his sighted guide, who recently had knee surgery.

The Championships can be seen free at IPC's internet TV channel ParalympicSport.TV as video on demand.

Schedule of events
The provisional schedule of the event is below. All times in UTC+3.

Medal winners
Calculated times

Biathlon

Men

Women

Cross-country skiing

Men

Women

Classification

Standing
LW2 - standing: single leg amputation above the knee
LW3 - standing: double leg amputation below the knee, mild cerebral palsy, or equivalent impairment
LW4 - standing: single leg amputation below the knee
LW5/7 - standing: double arm amputation
LW6/8 - standing: single arm amputation
LW9 - standing: amputation or equivalent impairment of one arm and one leg

Sitting
LW 10 - sitting: paraplegia with no or some upper abdominal function and no functional sitting balance
LW 11 - sitting: paraplegia with fair functional sitting balance
LW 12 - sitting: double leg amputation above the knees, or paraplegia with some leg function and good sitting balance

Visual impairment
B1 - visually impaired: no functional vision
B2 - visually impaired: up to ca 3-5% functional vision
B3 - visually impaired: under 10% functional vision

Skiers with a visual impairment compete with a sighted guide. The skier with the visual impairment and the guide are considered a team, and dual medals are awarded.

Calculated time
A percentage system is used to calculate the final time of each skier. Each skiers finishing time, is multiplied with a percentage factor, to determine a final, calculated time.

Within each category (sitting, standing, visual impairment) there are skiers with various classifications (for example B1, B2 and B3 in the visual impairment category). There are different percentage factors for each classification.

Participating nations
13 countries competed.

Medal table
Medal winners by nation.

See also
FIS Nordic World Ski Championships 2011
Biathlon World Championships 2011

References

 Winter Sport Classification, Canadian Paralympic Committee
 Each skier's classification per March 10, 2011, IPC Nordic Skiing

External links
Khanty-Mansiysk 2011 official site 
IPC Nordic Skiing
Live results, and schedule at ipclive.siwidata.com
ParalympicSport.TV, video on demand

 
World Para Nordic Skiing Championships
IPC
IPC
IPC
IPC
IPC
IPC
IPC